Macrinus bambuco is a species of giant crab spider in the family Sparassidae. It is found in Colombia.

References

Sparassidae
Articles created by Qbugbot
Spiders described in 2010